Operation Sentinel may refer to a number of different military operations:
2001–02 India–Pakistan standoff
Opération Sentinelle, the placing of military guards in major French cities after the 2015 terror attacks